Tully McCrea (July 23, 1839 – September 5, 1918) was a career United States Army artillery officer and graduate of the United States Military Academy at West Point (Class of 1862) who served in the American Civil War. He was promoted multiple times for gallant and meritorious service in battle, rising during the course of the war from the rank of second lieutenant to brevet major.

McCrea commanded Battery I, 1st U.S. Artillery at the Battle of Gettysburg after his commanding officer, Lieutenant George A. Woodruff, was mortally wounded.

Biography

Civil War service 
McCrea was born in Mississippi, from where he was appointed to the United States Military Academy at West Point in 1858 as a member of the Class of 1862. He graduated 14th out of 28 cadets.

Upon graduation in June 1862, the American Civil War was already in progress: McCrea was commissioned as a second lieutenant with Battery I, 1st U.S. Artillery and sent to join the Peninsula Campaign, then underway in Virginia. He was breveted to the rank of first lieutenant citing "gallant and meritorious service" at the Battle of Antietam on September 17, 1862.

McCrea was engaged with Battery I at Fredericksburg and Chancellorsville; at Gettysburg, he assumed command of the battery after his commanding officer was mortally wounded in action. For this service, he was again breveted to the rank of captain on July 3, 1863.

Following Gettysburg, he was transferred to Battery K and later Battery M, 1st U.S. Artillery, sent to the Carolinas and Florida. He participated in the Battle of Olustee, where he was severely wounded in action when shot through the legs. He was brevetted once more to the rank of major on February 20, 1864 for his service at Olustee.

The severity of his wounds compelled him to take a leave of absence which lasted throughout most of 1864; upon his return to active duty, McCrea was an instructor at West Point.

Post-war life and career 
Post-war, McCrea was promoted to the permanent rank of captain and attached to the 42nd U.S. Infantry in 1866 on mustering duty.

In 1870, McCrea rejoined the 1st U.S. Artillery, and later transferred to the 5th U.S. Artillery where he was promoted to the rank of major in 1888 and lieutenant colonel in 1898. He commanded multiple garrison posts across the United States, including Fort Columbus, New York, Fort Slocum, New York, Fort Hancock, New Jersey, Fort Wadsworth, New York, and Fort Canby, Washington.

McCrea was promoted to colonel of the 6th U.S. Artillery in July 1900.

After more than forty years of military service, he retired on February 22, 1903–one day after he was promoted to the rank of brigadier general.

Personal life 
McCrea was married to Harriet "Hattie" Camp in 1868. They had a daughter, Mary Alice, born in 1870. Alice McCrea was married to Lieutenant William Harvey Tschappat, 5th U.S. Artillery, in July 1898.

McCrea's wife died in 1917, after which he moved in to his daughter and son-in-law's home at West Point, New York.

McCrea died on September 5, 1918 at West Point, New York at the age of 79.

Notes

References 

 Cullum, George W. Biographical Registers of the Officers and Graduates of the United States Military Academy. Vol. 2. Boston: Houghton, Mifflin and Company, 1891.
 Heitman, Francis B. Historical Register and Dictionary of the United States Army, From its Organization, September 29, 1789, to March 2, 1903. Volume 1. Washington, D.C.: Government Printing Office, 1903.
McEnany, Brian R. For Brotherhood and Duty: The Civil War History of the West Point Class of 1862. Lexington, KY: University Press of Kentucky, 2015.
Commanding Officers of Battery I, 1st U.S. Artillery

1839 births
1918 deaths
Union Army colonels
United States Army generals
United States Army officers
United States Military Academy alumni
Burials at West Point Cemetery